Dragoon is an unincorporated community and census-designated place (CDP) in Cochise County, Arizona, United States. As of the 2010 census it had a population of 209. Dragoon has the ZIP code of 85609.

Demographics

Geography and climate
The community lies along the Union Pacific Railroad between the Dragoon Mountains to the southeast and the Little Dragoon Mountains to the northwest. Interstate 10 passes through the Texas Canyon area approximately three miles to the west of the village.

According to the Köppen Climate Classification system, Dragoon has a semi-arid climate, abbreviated "BSk" on climate maps.

History

Document 40. FBI Report on Japanese Internees in the United States, July 9, 1942 Re: Stanley Claude Samuel Johnston

One of the main concerns of U.S. officials throughout the Chicago Tribune case was the possibility that drawing attention to American knowledge of Japanese actions would lead the Japanese to realize their codes had been penetrated. Among the major possibilities for this would have been through Japanese officials or diplomats, assigned in the United States, acquiring that knowledge, either from the original Midway article or from any of the press coverage of the ensuing inquiries. The FBI assembled a meticulous record, presented here, of the treatment of the Japanese prior to their departure for a diplomatic exchange, via the cruise ship S.S. Gripsholm on June 18, 1942. The largest group of Japanese, including Washington embassy staff, had been located at White Sulphur Springs, West Virginia, since April 1942, and had had access only to the New York Times, which had not printed any of the Tribune reports. The Japanese consulate staff from Hawaii had been held at Dragoon, Arizona, where they were denied access to any media whatever. Another group, mainly Japanese officials from South America, had been at Asheville, North Carolina, and also had had only the New York Times. But there was a miscellaneous collection of 500 or so Japanese who had been at liberty, held in Army camps, internment camps (the FBI report freely used the term “concentration camps”), on Ellis Island or elsewhere, until starting to gather in New York on June 7, 1942. The FBI admitted that Japanese who had been at large could have had access to any media they wanted.

Excerpt of Memorandum for the Attorney General from the Federal Bureau of Investigation, dated JUL-9 1942 Declassified Authority NND76716

"There were twenty-three Japanese diplomats at Dragoon, Arizona, and all of this group had formerly been stationed in the Hawaiian Islands.  Special Agent Wells Bailey of the State Department accompanied them when they left Arizona and was with them until their arrival in New York City on June 10, 1942.  They were immediately taken to the Pennsylvania Hotel in New York City and were held incommunicado until they were taken aboard the SS Gripsholm on June 13, 1942.  Agent Bailey can testify to the fact that this group was not allowed to see any newspapers whatsoever during the time they were in Arizona and while they were en route to New York City.  He can also testify to the fact that this group was placed aboard the SS Gripsholm on June 13, 1942."

References

Unincorporated communities in Cochise County, Arizona
Unincorporated communities in Arizona